The Rapid City Journal (formerly the Black Hills Journal and the Rapid City Daily Journal) is the daily newspaper of Rapid City, South Dakota. As of 2021, it is the largest newspaper in South Dakota by total subscriptions, according to the United States Postal Service Statement of Ownership and the South Dakota Newspaper Association. It covers Mount Rushmore, the Black Hills, the Sturgis Motorcycle Rally, and the Pine Ridge Indian Reservation. 

The newspaper also publishes the Sturgis Rally Daily and Compass, which are two special supplements. The Sturgis Rally Daily is published during the annual Sturgis Motorcycle Rally, and Compass is the weekly shoppers tab.

History

The Rapid City Journal began on January 5, 1878, as the Black Hills Journal. Publisher Joseph P. Gossage produced the first edition of the Black Hills Journal, which was four pages and had 250 subscribers. Printed in a log cabin on Rapid Street, the first newspaper was laboriously cranked out on a Washington hand printing press.

The newspaper printed its first daily paper and changed its name to the Rapid City Daily Journal on February 2, 1886. It continued to publish as both a daily and a weekly newspaper until 1929.

It has acted as a historical record for western South Dakota, covering major events like the 1972 Black Hills flood, the annual Buffalo Roundup and auction in Custer State Park, Crazy Horse Memorial's annual volksmarch, and the annual Sturgis Motorcycle Rally. As of January 2022, Ben Rogers is the publisher and A.J. Etherington is the executive editor. For the newsroom, Nathan Thompson is the managing editor. 

The Rapid City Journal Media Group also publishes one weekly newspaper, The Chadron Record in Chadron, Nebraska. Nathan Thompson is the executive editor and Mark Dykes is the managing editor of The Chadron Record.

Publishers
 Joseph P. Gossage - January 1878 to April 1925
 Alice Gossage - April 1925 to June 1925
 Charles Mitchell - June 1925 to April 1926
 E.F. "Ted" Lusk - June 1925 to April 1939
 R.W. Hitchcock - April 1939 to February 1961
 Jean Hitchcock Mitchell - February 1961 to December 1964
 Willis Brown - December 1964 to September 1968
 Joyce A. Swan September 1968 to May 1971
 James W. "Rusty" Swan - May 1971 to November 1985
 David C. Sharp - November 1985 to April 1993
 Loretta Lynde - May 1993 to September 1994
 John Van Strydonck - October 1994 to September 2000
 Bill Masterson, Jr. - September 2000 to September 2006
 Rosanne Cheeseman - November 2006 to October 2007
 Brad Slater - October 2007 to June 2011
 Shannon Brinker - November 2011 to May 2017
 Eugene Jackson - May 2017 to March 2018
 Matthew Tranquill - January 2019 to January 2021
 Bill Masterson, Jr. - January 2021 to January 2022
 Ben Rogers - January 2022 to present

See also
 List of newspapers in South Dakota

External links
The Rapid City Journals website

Newspapers published in South Dakota
Lee Enterprises publications
Mass media in Rapid City, South Dakota
Publications established in 1878
1878 establishments in Dakota Territory